A breakout star is a person that has a breakthrough into widespread consciousness.

Breakout Star, also may refer to:

 "Breakout Star" (Amphibia), an episode of Amphibia
 "Breakout Star", several different awards given out at the Teen Choice Awards
 "Breakout Star", any of several pro-wrestling awards
 "Breakout Star", an award given out at the AEW Awards
 "Breakout Star", an award given out at the 2013 Radio Disney Music Awards

See also

 Best Breakout Star, former name of the MTV Movie Award for Best Breakthrough Performance 
 Breakout Star of the Year, an award given out at the NXT Year-End Award
 
 Breakout (disambiguation)
 Star (disambiguation)